The 2014 Boston Marathon took place in Boston, Massachusetts, on Monday, April 21 (Patriots' Day).  It was the 118th edition of the mass-participation marathon. The race is organized by the Boston Athletic Association.  On account of the 2013 Boston Marathon bombings, extra security measures were implemented.  The 2014 Marathon had about 36,000 registered participants, second only to the 1996 race in number of entries. The Boston Globe reported that over a million people were expected to line the marathon route to watch the race, twice the number who attend during a typical year.

Meb Keflezighi won the men's race in 2:08:37 and became the first American male runner to win the Boston Marathon since 1983. Ethiopian runner Bizunesh Deba won the women's race in 2:19:59, and was awarded the title on October 26, 2016, after a review by the IAAF disqualified original winner Rita Jeptoo.

Race description

The course runs through 26 miles 385 yards (42.195 km) of roads, mostly following Route 135, Route 16, Route 30, and city streets into the center of Boston, where the official finish line is located on Boylston Street in Copley Square alongside the Boston Public Library.  The race runs through Hopkinton, Ashland, Framingham, Natick, Wellesley, Newton, Brookline, and Boston.  The marathon had about 36,000 entries.  Increased participation after the 2013 marathon bombing required that an additional 9,000 participant spots be opened up, and the qualifying time lowered by 1 minute 38 seconds. The only Boston Marathon with more entries was the 1996 marathon, with 38,708 runners.

The race was held on April 21, 2014.  At the start, a moment of silence was held in memory of the 2013 bombings. The men and women's wheelchair group began their race at 8:50 am.  The race started for the elite women at 9:32, while the elite men started half an hour later.  Another moment of silence was announced (at least for television viewers) at 2:49 pm, in memory of the 2013 bombings, commemorating the exact minute when the 2013 bombings had occurred.

Ethiopian Bizunesh Deba (26) of Ethiopia crossed the finish line in 2:19:59 to win the race, setting a new course record.  The men's competition was won by Meb Keflezighi (38) of the United States with a time of 2:08:37, marking the first time the race had been won by an American male runner in over 30 years.

Security

After the bombings that took place during the 2013 Boston Marathon, killing three and injuring over 260, police vowed to institute additional security measures—including bag checks and additional barriers—while maintaining a friendly, happy atmosphere. More than 3,500 uniformed Boston Police officers were present for security.

Results

Results are from the Boston Athletic Association.

Wheelchair

References

External links

Official Website of the Boston Marathon
Top Finishers - Boston Athletic Association

Boston Marathon
Boston Marathon
Marathon
Boston Marathon
Boston
Boston Marathon